Freeth is a surname. Notable people with the surname include:

Andrew Freeth (1912–1986), British painter and etcher
Ben Freeth (born 1971), Zimbabwean farmer and activist
Denzil Freeth (1924–2010), English politician
Evelyn Freeth (1846–1911), English civil servant
Francis Arthur Freeth (1884–1970), British chemist
George Freeth (1883–1919), American surfer
Gordon Freeth (1914–2001), Australian politician
James Freeth (1872 - 1940), English artist
James Freeth (1786–1867), British Army general
James Freeth (1974)  Cambridge cricketer         
John Freeth (1731–1808), English innkeeper, poet and songwriter
Malcolm Freeth (1943)  English physician            
Peter Freeth (born 1968), English author
Rodger Freeth (1950–1993), New Zealand rally co-driver
Thomas Freeth, English artist
Zahra Freeth, British writer

See also
Freeth Bay, a bay in Antarctica